Batak may refer to:

Ethnic groups
It is a collective term used to identify a number of ethnic groups predominantly found in North Sumatra, Indonesia.
 Associated with the Indonesian Batak people:
 Batak languages
 Batak script
 Batak (Unicode block)
 Marga (Batak), Batak's family name
 Batak (Philippines), indigenous group of the Philippines
 Batek people, indigenous group of peninsular Malaysia

Locations
 Batak, Bulgaria, a city in Pazardzhik Province, Bulgaria
 Batak massacre (1876) in the city
 Batak Reservoir, near the city, in the Rhodope Mountains
 Batak, a village in Pavlikeni Municipality, Veliko Tarnovo Province, Bulgaria
 Batak Rabit, a small town in Hilir Perak district, Perak, Malaysia

Other
 Batak Pony
 Huria Kristen Batak Protestant
 Radoslav Batak (born 1977), Montenegrin football defender
 Batik, a technique of dyeing cloth, or cloth made using this technique, originating from Indonesia
 Batak, Philippine tattoos of the Igorot people